Harry F. Hemond is an American engineer, focusing on environmental chemistry and wetland chemistry. He is currently the William E. Leonhard Professor at the Massachusetts Institute of Technology.

References

Year of birth missing (living people)
Living people
MIT School of Engineering faculty
21st-century American engineers
Worcester Polytechnic Institute alumni
Connecticut College alumni
Place of birth missing (living people)